Loxopholis guianense is a species of lizard in the family Gymnophthalmidae. It is found in Guyana, French Guiana, Suriname, and Brazil.

References

Loxopholis
Reptiles described in 1952
Taxa named by Rodolfo Ruibal